Mihail Gyonin (born 25 November 1941) is a retired Bulgarian footballer. He was born in Vratsa. He competed at the 1968 Summer Olympics in Mexico City, where he won a silver medal with the Bulgarian team.

References

External links
Player Profile at levskisofia.info

1941 births
Living people
Bulgarian footballers
Bulgaria international footballers
FC Montana players
PFC Levski Sofia players
PFC Spartak Varna players
Akademik Sofia players
Olympic footballers of Bulgaria
Footballers at the 1968 Summer Olympics
Olympic silver medalists for Bulgaria
Olympic medalists in football
First Professional Football League (Bulgaria) players
People from Vratsa
Medalists at the 1968 Summer Olympics
Association football forwards